General elections were held in Gibraltar on 11 October 2007. The incumbent Chief Minister Peter Caruana narrowly won a fourth term, but opposition leader Joe Bossano had a very strong showing. Joe Bossano noted that this would be his last term as an MP, and joked that he would not join the government, despite receiving a higher personal vote than some members of the Gibraltar Social Democrats (GSD).

The GSD had ten candidates (all of whom were elected), Bossano's party the Gibraltar Socialist Labour Party (GSLP) had seven candidates (four of whom were elected) and the Liberal Party of Gibraltar (LPG) led by Dr. Joseph Garcia had three candidates (all of whom were elected). The Progressive Democratic Party (PDP) fielded six candidates, five of whom obtained the fewest votes in the election after a lacklustre campaign. Two independents were unable to break through Gibraltar's party block vote system but did relatively well. They were the right wing lawyer Charles Gomez of New Gibraltar Democracy and Richard Martinez of the Parental Support Group.

An exit poll organised by the Gibraltar Broadcasting Corporation (GBC) gave victory to the GSLP/Liberal coalition, but as counting progressed this proved incorrect.

Results

References

General elections in Gibraltar
Gibraltar
General
Gibraltar
Election and referendum articles with incomplete results